Pettifor is a surname. Notable people with the surname include:

Ann Pettifor (born 1947), British debt-relief activist, economist, and author
David Pettifor (1945–2017), British metallurgist and professor

See also
Pettiford